The Iran Mountains are a range of mountains on the island of Borneo. The mountains are on the border between Indonesia and Malaysia.

See also
 Geography of Indonesia
 Geography of Malaysia

References

Mountain ranges of Malaysia
Mountain ranges of Indonesia